The greater fat-tailed jerboa (Pygeretmus shitkovi) is a species of rodent in the family Dipodidae. It is endemic to Kazakhstan. Its natural habitat is temperate desert.

References

Pygeretmus
Mammals of Central Asia
Endemic fauna of Kazakhstan
Taxonomy articles created by Polbot
Mammals described in 1930
Taxobox binomials not recognized by IUCN